Jhalod is one of the 182 Legislative Assembly constituencies of Gujarat state in India. It is part of Dahod district and is reserved for candidates belonging to the Scheduled Tribes.

List of segments
This assembly seat represents the following segments,

 Jhalod Taluka (Part) Villages – Garadu, Dhavadiya, Bambela, Rajadiya, Kheda, Amba Jharan, Thunthi Kankasiya, Mahudi, Chhasiya, Ghensva, Maghanisar, Hadmat Khunta, Kharsana, Anvarpura, Sitavatli, Rajpur, Velpura, Kaliya Talav, Mun Khosla, Shankarpura, Fulpura, Timachi, Rampura, Raypura, Gamdi, Jafarpura, Chitrodiya, Devjini Sarasvani, Kalajini Sarsavani, Jetpur, Melaniya, Therka, Vagela, Ghodiya, Khakhariya, Nansalai, Bajarvada, Sarmariya, Varod, Sampoi, Tandi, Raniyar Kanbi, Paniya, Chakaliya, Pethapur, Mudaheda, Lilva Pokar, Raniyar Inami, Lilva Thakor, Nime Varod, Kuni, Simaliya, Kharvani, Vankol, Limdi, Lilva Deva, Malvasi, Piplod, Kankara Kuva, Kachaldhara, Chatka, Dhola Khakhara, Kotda, Sabli, Raliyati Bhura, Parthampur, Rupakheda, Karath, Nani Handi, Pareva, Pipaliya, Dungri, Thala (Limdi), Mundha, Golana, Suthar Vasa, Amba, Bilwani, Moti Handi, Dageriya, Vasti, Pavdi (Inami), Mirakhedi, Kaligam (Inami), Kaligam (Gujar), Dhara Dungar, Tadhagola, Dantiya, Raliati Gujjar, Gultora, Tatariya, Sharda, Chhayan, Jhalod (M).

Members of Legislative Assembly

Election results

2022

2017

2012

See also
 List of constituencies of Gujarat Legislative Assembly
 Gujarat Legislative Assembly
 Dahod district

References

External links
 

Assembly constituencies of Gujarat
Dahod district